Luc Wallays (7 August 1961 – 5 March 2013) was a Belgian professional racing cyclist. 

Wallays turned professional in 1984, after winning the Giro della Valle d'Aosta the previous year. He rode in the 1985 Tour de France. However his career was cut short due to a bacterial illness he contracted whilst in Chile. Wallays subsequently became a physiotherapist, and remained heavily involved in cycle racing: he coached his nephews, racing cyclists Jelle and Jens Wallays, served as sporting manager at Jonge Renners Roeselare cycling club, and was elite sport coordinator with the Flanders Cycling Federation from 2008 until his death. He was afflicted with cancer for the last six years of his life, overcoming the disease twice before succumbing to the illness in March 2013.

Major results
1982
 3rd Overall Giro della Valle d'Aosta
1983
 1st Overall Giro della Valle d'Aosta
1984
 4th Le Samyn
 8th Nationale Sluitingprijs
 8th Omloop van het Houtland
1985
 5th GP Stad Zottegem
 8th Grand Prix Cerami

References

External links
 

1961 births
2013 deaths
Belgian male cyclists
People from Roeselare
Cyclists from West Flanders